The Band Ice Cream is an American/Canadian garage rock band from San Francisco, California.

History 
The Band Ice Cream formed in San Francisco, California in 2015 as "Ice Cream" consisting of Kevin Fielding (Toronto), Joseph Sample (Grand Rapids), Dylan Murray and Raphael DiDonato. Their first EP We're Set was recorded by Mike Carnahan and released on January 15, 2015. Songs "Wild" and "Surfer Girl" from the EP earned the band praise both locally in the Bay Area and nationally with The Deli Magazine listing We're Set in their 10 Best Bay Area Albums of 2015. By the end of 2015 both DiDonato and Murray left the band and were replaced by Bryce Fernandez (O‘ahu) and Louis Rappoport on bass and drums.

Classically Trained (2017) 

In December 2016 the group signed to Urban Scandal Records as The Band Ice Cream, started working with producer Bruce Botnick and released their debut full-length album Classically Trained on March 10, 2017. Singles "Jerk It Off", "Sand Dunes" and "Mexico" premiered on Consequence of Sound, PunkNews and SF Weekly respectively.

Numbskull (2018) 

As recording began on this album, Rappoport left the group and was replaced by Dante Johnson. Recorded with Jack Shirley in East Palo Alto. "Numbskull" was released on August 17, 2018.

PLAY DEAD (2022) 

The third studio album by The Band Ice Cream. Tracked by Jack Shirley at Atomic Garden Oakland. Produced by Timothy Vickers aka Grandbankss.

Discography 
 Classically Trained (2017)
 Numbskull (2018)
 PLAY DEAD (2022)

References

Other Press

External links
 

American garage rock groups
Punk rock groups from California
Musical groups from Los Angeles
Musical groups established in 2014
2014 establishments in California